Gracefield GAA is a Gaelic football and ladies' Gaelic football club in Gracefield, County Offaly, Ireland. Their most notable period was in 1970, when they won the Leinster Senior Club Football Championship.

Honours 
Leinster Senior Club Football Championship: 1
1970
 Offaly Senior Football Championship: 4
1961, 1970, 1972, 1984
 Offaly Junior Football Championship: 2
 1930, 1958

Current Panel
 Conor Sheedy
 Aaron Whelan
 Óisín O'Dea
 Niall Parker
 Mark Ward
 Tristan Lambe
 Gavin Smyth
 Jamie Evans
 Niall Smith
 Patrick Hurley
 Philip Hurley
 Jason Slattery
 Jack Walsh
 Craig Dunne
 Stephen Flanagan
 Declan Hennessy
 James Flanagan
 Pauric Duffy
 Caoimhghin Murphy
 Conor Parker
 Cian Murphy
 Bobby Fitzpatrick
 Jake Nicol
 Patrick Dempsey
 Brian Brereton

References

External links 
Facebook page

Gaelic games clubs in County Offaly
Gaelic football clubs in County Offaly